Builders Exchange Building may refer to:

Builders Exchange Building (Santa Ana, California), listed on the National Register of Historic Places in Orange County, California
Builders Exchange Building (San Antonio, Texas), listed on the National Register of Historic Places in Bexar County, Texas